Fancott is a hamlet located in the Central Bedfordshire district of Bedfordshire, England.

The settlement forms part of the Toddington civil parish, and is also close to Chalgrave and Chalton. "The Fancott" public house is situated in Fancott, and is the location of the Fancott Miniature Railway. At the 2011 Census the population of the hamlet was included in the civil parish of Chalgrave

References

Hamlets in Bedfordshire
Central Bedfordshire District